The Antonio Treatment is a one-hour weekly docu-design series show on HGTV and is hosted by Antonio Ballatore, who won Season 4 of the HGTV reality show Design Star. The pilot episode aired on January 1, 2010 and the show officially premiered March 14, 2010,

Ballatore and his crew of unconventional craftsmen transform lackluster homes into radical–yet functional–custom creations. They make over multiple rooms in such locations as homes, offices, and any place suffering from drab decor that will benefit from Ballatore's unique and unapologetic design style. The series follows him as he explores new locations and design techniques, developing his craft, and finding his niche in the world of interior design.

Series overview

Episodes

Season 1

The pilot episode was shown on January 1, 2010. Season 1 premiered on March 14, 2010 with back to back episodes.

Season 2
On August 16, 2010, HGTV announced it had ordered an additional 13 episodes for a second season. Episodes will begin airing in the first quarter of 2011.

References

External links
Official HGTV site

HGTV original programming
Interior design
2010 American television series debuts
2011 American television series endings
2010s American reality television series